The Battles of Coronel and Falkland Islands is a 1927 British docudrama film directed by Walter Summers. The film focuses on the naval warfare around the Battle of Coronel and Battle of the Falkland Islands during the First World War. It was the last in a successful series of documentary reconstructions of First World War battles by British Instructional Films made between 1921 and 1927. The film was produced at Cricklewood Studios and on location off Malta and the Isles of Scilly. The film is an entirely fictional recreation with a strong documentary feel.

The film cost an estimated £18,000 to make. It grossed £70,000 in Britain alone. It was restored and re-released by the BFI in 2014.

Restoration
In 2014 the BFI National Archive restored the film for the centenary of the events with a new score composed by Simon Dobson.

Historical background
To counter the German squadron, the Royal Navy sent two battle-cruisers -  and  - to the South Atlantic. In December 1914, the British battle-cruisers, accompanied by smaller ships, engaged the German squadron during the Battle of the Falkland Islands and sank the German armoured cruisers  and  near the Falkland Islands.

References

Bibliography
 Dixon, Bryony Battles of the Coronel and Falkland Islands, The (1927). BFI Screenonline.
 Low, Rachael. History of the British Film, 1918-1929. George Allen & Unwin, 1971.
 Wood, Linda. British Films 1927-1939. British Film Institute, 1986.

External links

1927 films
1920s English-language films
Films directed by Walter Summers
British silent feature films
Films shot at Cricklewood Studios
World War I naval films
British black-and-white films
British documentary films
1927 documentary films
1920s British films
Silent war adventure films
1920s war adventure films